Furlong is an English-language surname, relatively common in the United Kingdom and in the Republic of Ireland.

Notable people with the surname include:

 Aaron Henry Furlong (born 1967), American jewellery designer
 Allan Furlong (born 1942), Canadian politician
 Campbell Furlong (born 1974), New Zealand cricketer
 Cathy Furlong, American statistician
 Charles W. Furlong (1874–1967), American explorer
 Darnell Furlong (born 1995), English footballer
 Dennis Furlong (1945–2018), Canadian politician
 Edward Furlong (born 1977), American actor
 Grant Furlong (1886-1973), American politician
 Jim Furlong (football) (born 1940), Canadian football linebacker
 John Furlong (American actor) (1933-2008), American actor
 John Furlong (Canadian) (born 1950), CEO of the Vancouver 2010 Olympic and Paralympic Winter Games
 Monica Furlong (1930-2003), British author, journalist and activist
 Nicholas Furlong (born 1929), Irish journalist and historian
 Nicholas Furlong (musician) (born 1986), American singer, songwriter, and record producer
 Nicola Furlong, Canadian novelist
Nicola Furlong
 Noel Furlong (1937–2021), Irish poker player
 Oscar Furlong (1927–2018), Argentine basketball player
 Paul Furlong (born 1968), English footballer
 Rob Furlong (born 1976), Canadian sniper who holds the record for the longest sniper kill in combat

Fictional characters
 Chance "T-Bone" Furlong, from Swat Kats
 Father Noel Furlong, from the sitcom Father Ted

See also
 Furlong Flynn (1901-1977), American football player and aviation pioneer
 Furlonge

English-language surnames